The Ultimate Playlist of Noise is a 2021 American romantic comedy-drama film directed by Bennett Lasseter and written by Mitchell Winkie. The film stars Keean Johnson and Madeline Brewer.

The Ultimate Playlist of Noise was released in the United States on January 15, 2021, by Hulu. It received mixed reviews from critics, who praised the performances of Johnson and Brewer, as well as their chemistry together, but criticized the film's predictability and overreliance on clichés.

Plot
Marcus Lund is a high school senior who is very music and sound obsessed. As a child, his older brother Alex saved him from their burning home, perishing in the process.

Marcus listens to all of the music Alex left behind. At a music gig, he falls for the singer who opens the show, but she takes off before he can introduce himself. Simultaneously he has a seizure.

After testing, Marcus is told he has a brain tumor requiring surgery that will render him deaf. Depressed at the idea that he soon won't be able to hear beloved sound, he compiles a playlist of 50 sounds he wants to record.

After giving a presentation of his plan to embark on a cross-country road trip to record the playlist, his mother rejects his plan. Marcus takes off in the car. A short time later, Mandy jumps in front of the car, and he knocks her off her feet. She jumps in, urging him to hurry.

Mandy's angry ex follows close behind on his motorcycle, trying to get the guitar from her. He breaks two windows and half jumps through the passenger window before Marcus drives through the red light, and Mandy pushes him out.

At a diner, Marcus and Mandy introduce themselves, he tells her saw her opener at the gig, telling her one day she'll make it. He shows her his 50 item playlist, and she shows him her limited edition 1959 Starling Gold Fender Stratocaster.

On their way to NYC, they record many of the items on the list, including a thunder storm, a multitude of wind chimes, fireworks, a perfect strike in bowling...

Arriving in NYC, they go to Mandy's aunt's place. Mandy heads off to her audition, while Marcus heads to the recording studio. There, he discovers that the fire had actually been started by Alex, that he had committed suicide.

Marcus confirms with his mother what happened at the fire then, returning to Mandy's aunt's he finds out Mandy headed for Penn Station. There, he discovers that she lied, there was no audition, she was there to sell the guitar.

Marcus leaves, getting someone to buy him liquor. He empties his anti-seizure medication bottles randomly on the street. As he falls, his recording equipment ends up getting smashed by a passing car. As he's taken to the hospital. Mandy finds the pills and the smashed tape recorder.

When Marcus' mother catches up with him in the hospital, he finds out that Alex had been bipolar. She drives him back home. Back in New York, Mandy struggles to get the tape recorder fixed, finally getting it done at Alex's friend's studio.

Back home, Alex awaits the operation, a box with the repaired tape recorder and his brother's demo arrive from Mandy. She records her well wishes to him. The day of the operation comes and Alex cherishes every last sound. Sending out his 'Ultimate Playlist of Noise' to all his contacts, he says he's now learning to appreciate the world with his other senses.

Cast
 Keean Johnson as Marcus Lund
 Madeline Brewer as Wendy
 Rya Kihlstedt as Alyssa
 Ian Gomez as Dominic
 Bonnie Hunt as Dr. Lubinsky
 Emily Skeggs as Laura
 Ariela Barer as Sarah
 Oliver Cooper as Dennis
 Jake Weary as Benjie
 Carol Mansell as Aunt Delilah
 Gordon Winarick as Alex

Production
On November 1, 2019, it was announced that Keean Johnson and Madeline Brewer were cast as the leads of the film, with Bennett Lasseter directing from a screenplay by Mitchell Winkie, with LD Entertainment and American High producing, and Hulu distributing. Later that month, on November 22, it was reported that Emily Skeggs, Oliver Cooper, Ariela Barer, Jake Weary, and Gordon Winarick would also be joining the cast.

Filming
Principal photography occurred in late 2019 and wrapped in mid-December. The film was shot in downtown Syracuse, New York, which served as a stand in for New York City.

Release
The Ultimate Playlist of Noise was digitally released by Hulu on January 15, 2021.

Critical response
On review aggregator Rotten Tomatoes, the film holds a 43% rating based on 14 reviews.

In a negative review, Adam Graham of The Detroit News wrote that the film is, “is a teen romance with no new material to offer.” Allen Adams of The Maine Edge opined that the film, “is well-intentioned and competently-made, but it simply can’t hit all the notes to which it aspires.”

Critics also noted the film's similarities to Sound of Metal, a film released less than two months before The Ultimate Playlist of Noise in which a drummer played by Riz Ahmed struggles to adapt to the sudden loss of his hearing.

References

External links
 

2021 films
2021 romantic comedy-drama films
American romantic comedy-drama films
Films about music and musicians
Films shot in New York (state)
Hulu original films
LD Entertainment films
2020s English-language films
2021 directorial debut films
2020s American films